The , also known as the Fukuoka City Zoological Garden, is a zoo and botanical garden established in 1953 and located within Minami-koen (En: "South park") at 1-1, Minami-Koen, Chūō-ku, Fukuoka, Fukuoka, Japan.

The garden contains about 1,300 types of outdoor garden plants, mostly common. Its greenhouse contains over 1,200 plant species including orchids, ferns, and cacti.

History

The gardens were originally established near the city's East park in 1933 as part of the celebration of the coronation of Emperor Hirohito. This small  zoo and botanical garden included about 500 animals and 100 species of plants. The zoo was closed to the public on 20 May 1944 due to the deteriorating state of World War II for the country. Large animals were subsequently euthanized. Pillars from the old zoo gate are still standing near one of the elementary schools in the city.

In 1949 the city approved the establishment of a zoo in the city's South park. The Fukuoka City Zoological Society was established in 1952, and 28 million was raised for the new zoo.

The zoo opened in its current location on 22 August 1953, with 143 animals representing 69 species. It included a play area with a miniature train and a Ferris wheel. When it opened, the zoo was home to one elephant, who was still living at the zoo in 2011.

In 1955 the zoo was transferred to the jurisdiction of the Jurisdiction of the Ministry of Economic Affairs and Tourism Division, Fukuoka. An additional  was added to the zoo in 1956, and the animal collection again expanded to include 400 individuals of 120 species.

By 2003 (the fiftieth anniversary of opening in its current location), the zoo had hosted more than 40 million visitors, and was home to 706 animals representing 168 species, including 57 species of mammals, 88 species of birds, and 23 species of reptiles.

See also 
 List of botanical gardens in Japan

Notes

External links
 
 (Japanese)

Botanical gardens in Japan
Zoos in Japan
Gardens in Fukuoka Prefecture
Buildings and structures in Fukuoka
Tourist attractions in Fukuoka
Zoos established in 1953
1953 establishments in Japan